Queen's School may refer to:
The Queen's School, Chester, England
Queen's School, Ibadan, Nigeria
Queen's School, Jamaica
Queen's School, North Adelaide, South Australia

See also

Queen's College (disambiguation)
Queens' School, Bushey, Hertfordshire, England
Queen Elizabeth School (disambiguation)
Queen's University (disambiguation)
Queen's University at Kingston, Ontario, Canada
Queen's School of Environmental Studies
Queen's School of Kinesiology and Health Studies
Queen's School of Medicine
Queen's School of Music
Queen's School of Religion
Queen's School of Urban and Regional Planning
 Queen's Gate School, London, England
 Queen's High School, Dunedin, New Zealand
 Queen's Park High School, Chester, England
 Queens Paideia School Long Island City, Queens, New York, United States